The Penang island slender gecko (Hemiphyllodactylus cicak) is a species of gecko. It is endemic to Penang Island in Malaysia.

References

Hemiphyllodactylus
Reptiles described in 2016
Endemic fauna of Malaysia
Reptiles of Malaysia